F.Y.P, the Five Year Plan, was a punk rock band founded in 1989 by Todd Congelliere, a predecessor to his more recent bands Toys That Kill and Underground Railroad to Candyland. During its history (from 1989 to 1999), it had a total of 20 different members.

History
F.Y.P, or the Five Year Plan, was a punk rock band of Todd Congelliere's that preceded the more recent bands Toys That Kill and Underground Railroad to Candyland. The group began as a one-man band with a cheap Fisher Price drum machine providing the beat.

Congelliere began work with F.Y.P in 1989, and disbanded it in 1999. Over the course of its existence that band had 20 members.

In 2012, original members Congelliere and Sean Cole with two other members of Toys That Kill, bassist Casey (Chachi) Ferrara and drummer  Mike "Jimmy Jackets" Felix, reunited as F.Y.P. for a handful of shows. By 2015 Congelliere had again stopped performing as F.Y.P.

Discography

Albums
 Finish Your Popcorn (1992)
 Dance My Dunce (1993) 
 Toilet Kids Bread (1996), produced by Blag Dahlia (of The Dwarves)
  My Man Grumpy (1997), also produced by Blag Dahlia
 Toys That Kill (2000)
 Five Year Plan (Collection of Previously Recorded Demos) (2006)

Singles and EPs
 Extra Credit (1990)
 Made In USA (1991)
 Cooties (1993)
 My Neighbores Is Stoopid (1993)
 Guido, Where Are You? (1993)
 Incomplete Crap (1994)
 Idiocy 101 (1994)
 Incomplete Crap Vol. 2 (1999)
 Come Home Smelly (2000)

Split EPs
 Propagandhi/F.Y.P. (1996)
 Chaniwa/F.Y.P (1999)

See also
Recess Records
Toys That Kill

References

External links
 Recess Records
 Browse for F.Y.P Press Reviews
[ AllMusic entry]

Punk rock groups from California
Pop punk groups from California
Recess Records artists